Planitia Descensus was named to commemorate the site of the first soft landing on the Moon of Luna 9 on 3 February 1966. It is located at Lat. 7.1°N and Long. 64.4W. It is the only officially named plain on the Moon. The Working Group of Commission 17 of the IAU confirmed the name of the site in 1970.

References

LQ10 quadrangle
Geological features on the Moon
Soviet lunar program